Dion Adrian Lambert (born February 12, 1969) is a former American football defensive back who played three seasons in the National Football League (NFL) with the New England Patriots and  Seattle Seahawks. He was drafted by the Patriots in the fourth round of the 1992 NFL Draft. He played college football at the University of California, Los Angeles and attended John F. Kennedy High School in Los Angeles, California. Lambert was also a member of the Amsterdam Admirals of the World League of American Football.

References

External links
Just Sports Stats

Living people
1969 births
Players of American football from Los Angeles
American football defensive backs
African-American players of American football
UCLA Bruins football players
New England Patriots players
Seattle Seahawks players
Amsterdam Admirals players
People from the San Fernando Valley
21st-century African-American people
20th-century African-American sportspeople